The Mitrospingidae is a family of passerine birds. It consists of three genera and four species. The family is found in South America and southern Central America. The family was identified in 2013, and consists of birds that have been traditionally placed in the family Thraupidae. The family was adopted by the American Ornithological Society in their 58th supplement of their checklist in 2017 and in the online list of birds maintained by Frank Gill, Pamela Rasmussen and David Donsker on behalf of the International Ornithological Committee (IOC).

Genera

References

 
Passeriformes
Bird families
Taxa named by Keith F. Barker
Taxa named by Kevin J. Burns (ornithologist)
Taxa named by John Klicka
Taxa named by Scott M. Lanyon
Taxa named by Irby J. Lovette